12th Light Infantry Brigade (Airmobile) - 12ª Bda Inf L (Amv) is a major elite unit of the Brazilian Army. Its headquarters is located in Cacapava in São Paulo. Its catchment area covers the whole country. It is framed by the 2nd Division Army / Military Command Southeast, based in São Paulo.

The 12th Light Infantry Brigade is organized, equipped and trained for deployment on short notice and at any point of the country. Can move by air, for business jets and civilian or military aircraft and helicopters Air Force, but their primary means of transportation are the rotorcraft Command Army Aviation. From bases located near their barracks, their main means of transport is by helicopter, means of transport by which performs its main function, the airmobile assault, the Light Brigade constitutes an effective instrument of strategic reach permanently available to the Land Force, being an integral unit of the Rapid Action Force and Strategic (FAR) in the Brazilian Army.

History

On June 18, 1919, the 4th Infantry Brigade was created, based in the city of São Paulo, and after successive transformations, gave rise to the current Light Brigade. In September 1919 the Brigade was transferred to Cacapava, having been temporarily extinguished in November 1930. In October 1932 Command of the 4th Inf Brigade was reactivated in May and 1934 becomes organic 2nd Infantry Division.
    
In 1938 it was opened the Command Infantry divisional (ID / 2), replacing the 4th Inf Brigade, which is extinct. Remains under that name until 1971, when a change occurs to the 12th Infantry Brigade and becomes part of the 2nd Army Division.
    
Fifteen years later had his name changed again, and began to form in the 12th Motorized Infantry Brigade, finally, by Ministerial Reserved No. 023, of June 19, 1995, was transformed in the 12th Light Infantry Brigade (Airmobile), maintaining its headquarters in Cacapava.

Organic military units

 Command 12th Light Infantry Brigade (Airmobile) - Caçapava
 Command Company of 12th Light Infantry Brigade (Airmobile) – Caçapava
 4th Light Infantry Battalion (Motorized) – Osasco
 5th Light Infantry Battalion (Motorized) - Lorena
 6th Light Infantry Battalion (Mechanized) - Caçapava
 20th Light Field Artillery Group (Airmobile) - Barueri
 22nd Light Logistic Battalion - Barueri
 1st Light Cavalry Mechanized Battalion (Airmobile) - Valença 
 12th Light Combat Engineering Company – Pindamonhangaba
 5th Anti-Air Missile & Gun Artillery battery - Osasco
 12th Light Signals Company - Caçapava
 12th Army Police Platoon - Caçapava

Kind of Organic Units

Light Infantry Battalion (Motorized) - Anti-tank and anti-air capable, 54 wheeled motorized fast vehicles, all weather combat, airmobile / air-dropable
Infantry Battalion (Mechanized) - Anti-tank and anti-air capable, 54 wheeled light armoured fast vehicles, all weather combat, airmobile
Light Cavalry Mechanized Battalion (Airmobile) - Fast light armoured, anti-tank / recognition / security, 54 combat vehicles, airmobile
Light Field Artillery Group (Airmobile) - Field artillery, airmobile, 24 fast mountable / unmountable howitzer artillery

See also
 Defense Ministry - Ministério da Defesa
 Brazilian Army
 Military Brigades

References

External links
Site of 12ª Bda Inf L (Amv)

Army units and formations of Brazil